Galissus cyanopterus is a species of beetle in the family Cerambycidae. It was described by Dupont in 1840.

References

Trachyderini
Beetles described in 1840